Maureen Stolt (born March 3, 1979) is an American curler from Plymouth, Minnesota.

Stolt competes with her husband Peter Stolt in mixed doubles competition. Together they have won the United States Mixed Doubles Curling Championship once, in 2013, and finished in second place three times. Their national championship in 2013 earned them the right to represent the US at the 2013 World Mixed Doubles Curling Championship, where they finished in fourth place in the Yellow Pool.

References

External links 

1979 births
Living people
American female curlers
People from Plymouth, Minnesota
Curlers from Saskatoon
Canadian women curlers
Canadian emigrants to the United States
University of South Dakota alumni